James Emerson Foor (born January 13, 1949) is an American former professional baseball player. He was a left-handed pitcher who appeared in 13 Major League games played (but only six innings), all as a relief pitcher, for the Detroit Tigers and the Pittsburgh Pirates between 1971 and 1973.

Foor went to McClure High School in Florissant, Missouri, before being drafted in the first round, 15th overall, by the Tigers in 1967. Jim made his debut with the Tigers on April 9, 1971. He pitched 3 games for them total that year, giving up 2 earned runs, walking 4 and striking out 2. In 1972, Foor once again struggled with control, walking 6 in just 3 and 2/3 innings. He ended that season with one win and a 14.73 E.R.A.

He was traded with Norm McRae from the Tigers to the Pirates for Dick Sharon at the Winter Meetings on November 27, 1972. In 1973, Foor pitched in three games for the Pirates, walking one, striking out one and giving up no earned runs. After the season, on March 28, 1974, Foor was once again traded by the Pittsburgh Pirates to the Kansas City Royals for Wayne Simpson. He would never play again in the major leagues, and finished his career with a 1–0 record, a 12.00 earned run average, and five strikeouts.

References

External links
Baseball-Reference profile

1949 births
Living people
Detroit Tigers players
Pittsburgh Pirates players
Major League Baseball pitchers
Baseball players from St. Louis
Lakeland Tigers players
Montgomery Rebels players
Toledo Mud Hens players
Omaha Royals players
Charleston Charlies players
Tucson Toros players
Tulsa Oilers (baseball) players